{{Infobox person
| image              = NikolaNovak Joel2015.jpg
| name               = Joel Ivany
| birthname          = 
| birth_date         = 
| birth_place        = Penticton, British Columbia
| death_date         = 
| death_place        = 
| occupation         = Stage director
| nationality        = Canadian
| alias              = 
| title              = 
| organization       = Against the Grain Theatre, Edmonton Opera, Banff Centre for Arts and Creativity
| spouse             = Miriam Khalil
| children           = 
| years_active       = 2011–present
| relatives          = 
| alma_mater         = University of Western OntarioUniversity of Toronto
| networth           = 
| credits            = Messiah, Don Giovanni, and Così fan tutte
| website            = 
| agent              = 
}}

Joel Ivany is a Canadian stage director and artistic director of Against the Grain Theatre in Toronto, Ontario and artistic director of Edmonton Opera. He is known for directing adaptations of the Messiah, Don Giovanni, and Così fan tutte. Ivany is currently the Program Director for Opera at the Banff Centre.

 Early life and education 

Joel Ivany holds a Bachelor's of Music degree from the University of Western Ontario and an Artist Diploma in Opera Directing from the University of Toronto. His directing career began in 2011 when he won Third Prize in the 6th European Opera Directing Competition for his concept presentation of Bellini's I Capuleti e i Montecchi alongside Canadian designers Camellia Koo and Jason Hand.
 
 Career 

He made his concert directorial debut with the Toronto Symphony Orchestra in a staged presentation of Requiem (Mozart) and his main stage operatic directing debut at the Canadian Opera Company directing Carmen, both in 2016.

He is perhaps best known as an opera director through his company, Against the Grain Theatre (AtG). As its founder and artistic director, Ivany has worked to present modern adaptations of past operas. Through his company, Against the Grain Theatre, he has produced adaptations of La bohème in a bar, Pelléas et Mélisande in an outdoor courtyard, Le nozze di Figaro in a wedding venue, aptly renamed Figaro's Wedding, Così fan tutte renamed A Little Too Cozy and set in a reality television dating game show and in one of the CBC's very own television studios in Toronto, an outdoors reinterpretation of Mozart's Don Giovanni titled Uncle John, a staged/choreographed Messiah, and The Turn of the Screw in a converted attic.
 
As a main stage opera director he has received critical acclaim in such productions The Tales of Hoffmann with Edmonton Opera, Macbeth for Minnesota Opera and Carmen for Vancouver Opera.

In Canada he has directed for the Canadian Opera Company, Vancouver Opera, Edmonton Opera, Against the Grain Theatre, the University of Toronto, Wilfrid Laurier University, Music Niagara, Opera Nuova, the University of Western Ontario, The Royal Conservatory of Music, and the Banff Centre.

Internationally he has worked with Washington National Opera, Minnesota Opera, The Norwegian National Opera, Bard Summerscape, Deutsche Oper Berlin, Wexford Festival, the Adelaide Festival, Opera Holland Park, and Lyric Opera Studio Weimar.

He co-directed the Messiah/Complex for Against the Grain Theatre which became a worldwide hit and reviewed in the New York Times.

He was named Artistic Director of Edmonton Opera, November 2021.

 Awards and recognition 

Ivany has written four original adaptations of opera librettos including La bohème, Don Giovanni, Le nozze di Figaro and Così fan tutte. His production of Figaro's Wedding garnered 7 Dora Mavor Moore Award nominations including Outstanding Production, Outstanding Direction, and a win for Dora Mavor Moore Award for Outstanding New Musical/Opera in 2014.

In 2015 his production of Uncle John received three Dora Mavor Moore Award nominations.

In 2018 he was inducted into the Faculty of Music Alumni Wall of Fame at his Alma Mater, Western University

In 2018 his co-production of Orphée+'' received 9 Dora Mavor Moore Award nominations and won 5 awards including Outstanding Production.

In 2020 he was named a Canadian Arts Hero in the Globe and Mail.

Personal life
Joel Ivany resides in Edmonton, Canada with his wife, soprano Miriam Khalil and two sons, Sammy and Amil Ivany.

References 

Canadian theatre directors
Canadian opera directors
University of Western Ontario alumni
Living people
Canadian artistic directors
University of Toronto alumni
Dora Mavor Moore Award winners
Year of birth missing (living people)
Place of birth missing (living people)